Ingo Borgmann (born 17 June 1965) is a German former water polo player. He competed at the 1988 Summer Olympics, the 1992 Summer Olympics and the 1996 Summer Olympics.

See also
 Germany men's Olympic water polo team records and statistics
 List of men's Olympic water polo tournament goalkeepers

References

External links
 

1965 births
Living people
Water polo goalkeepers
German male water polo players
Olympic water polo players of West Germany
Olympic water polo players of Germany
Water polo players at the 1988 Summer Olympics
Water polo players at the 1992 Summer Olympics
Water polo players at the 1996 Summer Olympics
Sportspeople from Hamm